Dolynska Raion was a raion (district) of Kirovohrad Oblast in central Ukraine. The administrative center of the raion was the city of Dolynska. The raion was abolished on 18 July 2020 as part of the administrative reform of Ukraine, which reduced the number of raions of Kirovohrad Oblast to four. The area of Dolynska Raion was merged into Kropyvnytskyi Raion.

At the time of disestablishment, the raion consisted of two hromadas: 
 Dolynska urban hromada with the administration in Dolynska;
 Hurivka rural hromada with the administration in the selo of Hurivka.

References

Former raions of Kirovohrad Oblast
1923 establishments in Ukraine
Ukrainian raions abolished during the 2020 administrative reform